Rhaetian Railway in the Albula / Bernina Landscapes is a World Heritage Site comprising the Albula Railway and the Bernina Railway. The best known trains operating on this site are the Glacier Express and the Bernina Express.

See also
 Rhaetian Railway

World Heritage Sites in Italy
World Heritage Sites in Switzerland